The Alliance for Community Media (ACM), is an educational, advocacy and lobbying organization in the United States which represents Public, educational, and government access (PEG) cable TV organizations and community media centers throughout the country. 

The ACM was founded in 1976 as the National Federation of Local Cable Programmers (NFLCP), with the stated mission to “protect and increase freedom of expression, diversity of ideas and community communication through electronic media”. The mission statement has evolved over the years to “Promoting civic engagement through community media”.
The ACM works to protect the interests of community media centers and those who use PEG facilities and equipment to promote localism and diversity in programming through cable television and the Internet. They have offices in Washington, DC, with three employees and roughly $600,000 annual revenue.

History
The predecessor to the ACM, the NFLCP, was formed in 1976 by a group of media activists based in the Alternate Media Center (AMC), a New York University (NYU)-based organization created by American documentary filmmaker George C. Stoney and Red Burns to encourage citizens to tell their own stories through video production. 
The NFLCP held its first national convention and Hometown USA video awards in 1978 in Madison, Wisconsin, at which time a board was established to lead the non-profit organization. 
The NFLCP persuaded industry and government regulatory agencies to dedicate a portion of the new cable broadcast spectrum to public-access television, a requirement that was codified in federal communications law in 1984. Part of the agreement was to set aside bandwidth and funding for TV channels dedicated to public, educational, and governmental access programming (PEG).

The 1970s and 1980s were the heyday of access television, with hundreds of TV operations springing up in communities around the country. The ACM grew in response to the unique needs of this group of professionals, many of whom ran small operations that required them to multitask as program producer, manager, technical support, and more. The ACM facilitated training, networking, and resources to support this specialized role.

In 1992 the organization was renamed “Alliance for Community Media” so as to recognize the scope to be more than “just cable”. In the following decades new forms of media delivery became incorporated into the average PEG operation and by extension, into the agenda of the ACM's educational programs.

Organization
The ACM is a professional membership and advocacy organization. Originally established as a single non-profit entity, the ACM shifted its membership and lobbying activities in 2011 to a 501(c)6 organization, while maintaining 501(c)3 status for the newly named Foundation for the Alliance for Community Media - to manage educational and charitable endeavors such as the Hometown Awards and the Emerging Leaders Institute.

To help in the coordination of national activities, the Alliance for Community Media divides the U.S. into regions, most of which are governed by regional boards and represented on the national ACM board.  As of 2016, the active ACM regions are:

 ACM NorthEast Region (New York, Vermont, New Hampshire, Maine, Massachusetts, Connecticut, Rhode Island)

 ACM West Region (Arizona, California, Colorado, Hawaii, New Mexico and Nevada) 

 ACM Central States Region (Kentucky, Indiana, Michigan, Ohio)

 ACM Northwest Region (Alaska, Alberta, British Columbia, Idaho, Montana, Oregon, Utah, Washington, and Wyoming)

 ACM MidWest Region (Illinois, Iowa, Kansas, Minnesota, Missouri, Nebraska, North Dakota, South Dakota, Wisconsin)

Historically the ACM also had Southeast, Southwest and Mid-Atlantic Regions, but these dissolved for lack of activity. In 2022 - February 15 - the Jersey Access Group (JAG, headquartered in Metuchen, New Jersey) announced they had just joined ACM. Southern PEG operations were severely curtailed as a result of new cable regulations in those states in the early 21st century.

In a re-organization of ACM affiliation rules in 2013, former ACM Chapters were given greater independence and invited to continue to participate in the ACM through Affiliate membership, which was created to give like-minded groups such as Mass Access a path to collaboration with the ACM on issues of mutual interest.

Within the ACM, the Caucus of Inclusion, Equity and Engagement takes responsibility for research and recommendations on collaborating with communities that are underserved by mainstream media.

Advocacy
From its founding, the ACM has been primarily focused on the needs of Public, Educational, and Governmental (PEG) access stations and the regulatory environment fostering their existence. The NFLCP and George Stoney's cohort were instrumental in getting a legal basis for the public interest requirement written into the Cable Communications Policy Act of 1984.  In 1996 the ACM was a petitioner in a U.S. Supreme Court decision involving the potential censorship of material that an operator "reasonably believes ... depicts sexual ... activities or organs in a patently offensive manner." In 2013 ACM published a summary of the implications for their members of the 2010 Southern New York district court decision in Viacom International Inc. v. YouTube, Inc..

The ACM has taken up a number of causes on behalf of the PEG community, including:
 Protection of funding sources at the national, state and local levels
 Defending the PEG industry against efforts to reduce its effectiveness
 Promoting training and best practices within the PEG community
 Helping community media centers prepare for future technologies

The ACM staff, with assistance from ACM's Policy Working Group helps the PEG community identify potential threats and solutions to the policy discussions that would affect their ability to operate.

The ACM also works to raise awareness among policymakers of the importance of local media literacy and access.

Activities
ACM members have the opportunity to learn and network at the ACM national conference every year, as well as ACM regional conferences.  These conferences typically include a tradeshow, educational seminars, and a video contest. At the national level, the Hometown Awards began in the early days of the NFLCP, and typically attracts hundreds of entries, including locally produced shows, public service announcements, sporting events, and community highlights.

In addition, the ACM publishes a newsletter about developments in the community media field.  Originally entitled “Community Television Review” the newsletter was later renamed “Community Media Review”, and eventually moved to an online emailed format.

The ACM conducts educational programs for its members, including training webinars, policy conference calls, calls to action, and a mentorship program.

See also 
 Public, educational, and government access 
 Public-access television
 Community Media Association (UK)
 World Association of Community Radio Broadcasters (Worldwide)
 Alliance Community Radio Austria (Austria)
 Alliance Community Television Austria (Austria)

References

External links
 Alliance for Community Media website
 Community Media Review archive on archive.org
 MassAccess (Massachusetts)

American public access television
Television channels and stations established in 1990